Sarwat Nazir is a Pakistani fiction writer, novelist, screenwriter, and playwright. She is best known for her screen play Main Abdul Qadir Hoon and Umm-e-Kulsoom. She has done another phenomenal show  Dobol  Which has gotten phenomenal success and can be said as one of the most finest show ever by  Pakistani Drama Industry.

Selected works

Novels
The following novels have been written by Sarwat Nazir:

 Faislay Ka Lamha
 Roshan Sitara
 Main Abd-ul-Qadir Hum
 Sitamgar
 Umm-e-Kulsoom
 Roshan Sitara
 Muhabbat Aisa Darya ha
 Sirat-e-Mustaqeem
 Gawah Rehna
 Khuwab Hain Hum
 Sach ki Pari
 Faslay ka Lamha
 Besharam

Plays and dramas
She has written a number of plays in the past and she is writing more screenplays than novels nowadays:
 Main Abdul Qadir Hoon
 Besharam (TV series) 
 Shikwa 
 Mumkin 
 Aik Pal
 Umm-e-Kulsoom 
 Roshan Sitara
 Sitamgar (TV series)
 Sirat-e-Mustaqeem
 Tere Baghair
 Noor-e-Zindagi
  Sehra Main Safar
 Choti Si Zindagi
 Tanhai (TV series)
 Khaas
 Aas (TV drama)
 Qayamat (TV series)
 Pardes
 Dobara (TV series)

Awards and nominations
Nomination
 Best Writer Drama Serial for Roshan Sitara at 1st Hum Awards 2013.

Lux Style Awards

References

External links
Facebook page

Living people
People from Sialkot
Pakistani women writers
Pakistani novelists
Hum Award winners
Pakistani screenwriters
Lux Style Award winners
Pakistani television writers
Writers from Lahore
Pakistani dramatists and playwrights
Pakistani women novelists
Women dramatists and playwrights
Women television writers
Year of birth missing (living people)